The Coupe de la Ligue Final 1999 was a football match held at Stade de France, Saint-Denis on May 8, 1999, that saw RC Lens defeat FC Metz 1–0 thanks to a goal by Daniel Moreira.

Match details

See also
Coupe de la Ligue 1998-1999

External links
Report on LFP official site

1999
Coupe De La Ligue Final 1999
Coupe De La Ligue Final 1999
Coupe
May 1999 sports events in Europe
Sport in Saint-Denis, Seine-Saint-Denis
Football competitions in Paris
1999 in Paris